Pruzzo is an Italian surname. Notable people with the surname include:

 Lucas Pruzzo (born 1994), Argentine footballer 
 Roberto Pruzzo (born 1955), Italian football player and coach

Italian-language surnames